Košarkaški klub Mladost, commonly referred to as KK Mladost Zemun or as Mladost Maxbet due to sponsorship reasons, is a men's professional basketball club based in Zemun, near Belgrade, Serbia. They are currently competing in the Basketball League of Serbia.

Sponsorship naming
KK Mladost has had several denominations through the years due to its sponsorship:

Players

Current roster

Head coaches 

 Miomir Lilić (1974–1975)
 Duško Vujošević (1984–1985)
 Petar Rodić (1987–1988)
 Zoran Prelević (1988–1989)
 Jovica Antonić (1990–1994)
 Dejan Srzić (1995–1997)
 Dejan Srzić (1999–2001)
 Dragan Nikolić (2005–2006)
 Zoran Višić (2008–2009)
 Dragan Nikolić (2014–2016)
 Lazar Spasić (2016–2017)
 Branko Maksimović (2017–2018)
 Marko Barać (2018–2019)
 Dragan Jakovljević (2019–present)

Trophies and awards

Trophies
Second League of Serbia (2nd-tier)
Winner (1): 2014–15

Notable players

 Andrija Bojić
 Vuk Malidžan
 Stefan Pot
 Uroš Trifunović
 Aleksej Nešović
 Zhao Xuxin
 Boris Bakić
 Trey Drechsel

See also 
 KK Partizan
 KK Zemun

External links
Official website
Profile at eurobasket.com

Basketball teams in Belgrade
Basketball teams established in 1954
Sport in Zemun